Below Zero may refer to:

 Below Zero (1930 film), a 1930 Laurel and Hardy film
 Below Zero (2011 film), a 2011 film
 Below Zero (2021 film), a 2021 film
 Below Zero (Robert Rich album)
 Below Zero (Waltari album), 2009
 Subnautica: Below Zero, a video game and sequel to Subnautica, developed by Unknown Worlds Entertainment

See also 
 Less than Zero (disambiguation)